Kathy Fields (born January 5, 1947) is an American photographer and actress. She is best known for her role as Kareen in the film Johnny Got His Gun (1971). She later became a professional photographer.

Personal life 
Fields is the daughter of actress Edith Fellows and agent and producer Freddie Fields. She was married to actor David Lander from 1979 until his death in 2020. Their daughter, Natalie Lander, was born on March 28, 1983.

Acting filmography
The Happy Ending (1969)
Johnny Got His Gun (1971)

Camera filmography
The Towering Inferno (1974) – Still photographer 
The Man Who Would Be King (1975) – Still photographer
Robin and Marian (1976) – Still photographer
Lipstick (1976) – Still photographer
Fun with Dick and Jane (1977) – Still photographer
Bobby Deerfield (1977) – Still photographer
Looking for Mr. Goodbar (1977) – Still photographer
The Betsy (1978) – Still photographer
C.H.O.M.P.S. (1979) – Still photographer

References

External links
 

American photographers
1947 births
Living people
Place of birth missing (living people)
American actresses
Jewish American actresses
21st-century American Jews
21st-century American women